Debora Dubei (born January 4, 1997) is a Hungarian basketball player for UNI Gyor and the Hungarian national team.

She participated at the EuroBasket Women 2017.

References

1997 births
Living people
Hungarian women's basketball players
People from Orosháza
Shooting guards
Sportspeople from Békés County